Charles Foster (born 1962) is an English writer, traveller, veterinarian, taxidermist, barrister and philosopher. He is known for his books and articles on Natural History, travel (particularly in Africa and the Middle East), theology, law and medical ethics. He is a Fellow of Green Templeton College, Oxford. He says of his own books: 'Ultimately they are all presumptuous and unsuccessful attempts to answer the questions 'who or what are we?', and 'what on earth are we doing here?'

Education
He was educated at Shrewsbury School and St John's College, Cambridge University, where he read Veterinary Medicine and Law. He holds a PhD in medical law and ethics from the University of Cambridge. He is a qualified veterinary surgeon. He was called to the Bar by the Inner Temple.

Career
After Cambridge he worked on the comparative anatomy of the Himalayan Hispid hare and chemotaxis in leeches, worked in Saudi Arabia studying the immobilisation of Goitred and Mountain gazelles, did pupillage at the English Bar, and was a research fellow at the Hebrew University, Jerusalem. He was a research assistant to Aharon Barak, Justice (and later President) of the Supreme Court of Israel. He practises at the Bar in London, primarily in medical law, and has been involved in some of the most significant cases of recent years. He was called to the Bar of the Republic of Ireland in 1996. He teaches Medical Law and Ethics at the University of Oxford and was a Visiting Fellow of Green College, Oxford. In 2009 he was elected a Fellow of Green Templeton College, Oxford.

Recent expeditions have included  the Danakil Depression in Ethiopia, studying water metabolism in mules; ecological surveys in the Quirimbas Archipelago, northern Mozambique, and a successful ski expedition to the North Pole. He is a Fellow of the Royal Geographical Society and the Linnean Society.

In the fields of law and philosophy he is probably best known for his criticisms of the hegemony of autonomy in medical ethics (in 'Choosing Life, Choosing Death' (2009)), and for his contention that the 'Four Principles' approach of Beauchamp and Childress is redundant, and should be replaced by an analysis based on a broadly Aristotelean account of human dignity ('Human Dignity in Bioethics and Law' (2011)).

Many of his writings on religion have been attacked as heretical by conservative Christians, particularly in the US.

As part of his philosophical investigations relating to authenticity and identity, he has tried living as a badger, an otter, an urban fox, a red deer and a swift, and he has written about this in his book Being a Beast in 2016. For living in the wild as, at different times, a badger, an otter, a deer, a fox, and a bird, he won an Ig Nobel prize in Biology.

Bibliography 
In addition to a large number of articles, there are the following books and book chapters:

Tripping and Slipping Cases: A Practitioner's Guide: Longman/FT Law and Tax/Sweet and Maxwell, 1st Ed. 1994: 2nd Ed. 1996: 3rd Ed. 2002, 4th Ed. 2005
Disclosure and Confidentiality: FT Law and Tax, 1996 (with T. Wynn and N. Ainley)
Personal Injury Toolkit: FT Law and Tax/ Sweet and Maxwell, 1st Ed.1997, 2nd Ed. 1998, 3rd Ed. 1999, 4th Ed. 2001, 5th Ed. 2002, 6th Ed. 2003 (Electronic and paper publication, with G. Reeds and M. Bennet).
Clinical confidentiality: Monitor Press, 2000 (with Nick Peacock)
Desert Travellers: from Herodotus to T.E. Lawrence: Ed. Starkey and El Daly; ASTENE Publications, 2000: Chapter on: “The Zoology of Herodotus and his Greek descendants.”
Civil Advocacy: Cavendish (with Charles Bourne, Jacqui Gilliatt and Prashant Popat): 2nd Ed. 2001
Healthcare Law: The impact of the Human Rights Act 1998 (Ed. Garwood-Gowers, Tingle and Lewis): Cavendish, 2001: Chapter on “Access, Procedure and the Human Rights Act 1998 in Medical Cases”.
Drafting: Cavendish, 2nd Ed. 2001 (with Elmer Doonan)
Twenty-First Century Nursing: Law and Ethics: TVF Medical Communications/Pharmacia (CD Rom)
Clinical Guidelines: Law, policy and practice: Cavendish, 2002 (joint editor with John Tingle and chapter on “Civil procedure, trial issues and clinical guidelines).
Nursing Law and Ethics: Blackwell Scientific. 2nd Ed., 2002. Ed. Tingle and Cribb. Chapter on: Negligence: The legal perspective.
The literature of travel and exploration: Fitzroy Dearborn, 2003 (contributor): Edited by Jennifer Speake. Essays on Cairo, Damascus, the Gobi desert, the Mekong River, travellers of the ancient Greek world, western travellers to Central Asia, Ranulph Fiennes, Fitzroy Maclean.
Freedom Fighters: Authentic Press, 2005. Ed. Rob Frost: Chapter on 'Law, Freedom and Christian Principle in England'
Travellers in the Near East: Stacey International (Editor), 2004
Sahara Overland: Trailblazer publications, 2004. Ed. Chris Scott: Section on travel with camels, 2004		
Regulating Health Care Quality: Legal and Professional Issues: Butterworth Heinemann/Elsevier Science (Editor, with John Tingle and Kay Wheat), and chapter on 'Disciplinary jurisdiction over the medical and other healthcare professions':  2004
Elements of Medical Law, 2005, Barry Rose, 2nd Ed. 2007, Claerhout Publishing
Personal Injury, 2006, Jordans (contributor)
The Jesus Inquest, 2006: Lion Hudson
Medical Mistakes, 2007: Claerhout Publishing
The Christmas Mystery, 2007: Authentic Books
Tracking the Ark of the Covenant, 2007: Lion Hudson
Veterinary Negligence: in Professional Negligence and Liability, Informa, 2008
Choosing Life, Choosing Death: The tyranny of autonomy in medical ethics and law, 2009: Hart
The misadventures of Mr. Badshot, 2010, Quiller (with James St Clair Wade)
Medical Law Precedents, 2010, Wildys
The Selfless Gene: Living with God and Darwin, 2009 (Hodder) and 2010 (Thomas Nelson)
The Sacred Journey, 2010, Thomas Nelson
Wired for God? The Biology of religious experience, 2010, Hodder
'Challenging the Inquiry', in Public Inquiries, 2011, OUP
Human dignity in bioethics and law, 2011, Hart
In the hot unconscious: An Indian Journey, 2012, Tranquebar
Medical Law: A Very Short Introduction, 2013, Oxford University Press
Dementia: Law and Ethics, 2014, Hart (editor, with Jonathan Herring and Israel Doron)
Altruism, Welfare and the Law, 2015, Springer (with Jonathan Herring)
Being a Beast, 2016, Profile Books
The Screaming Sky, 2020, shortlisted for Wainwright Prize

References

External links
Charles Foster's personal website
Profile at Green Templeton College
 "Outer Temple Chambers | Charles Foster", barrister biography.
 "Charles Foster, Ethox Associate", biography and bibliography, at The Ethox Centre.
 "Charles Foster – Curriculum Vitae – Detail", detailed CV, from personal website.

1962 births
Living people
English theologians
English naturalists
Writers from London
Fellows of the Royal Geographical Society
Scholars of medical law
English veterinarians
Alumni of St John's College, Cambridge